The 1999–2000 NBA season was the Rockets' 33rd season in the National Basketball Association, and 29th season in the city of Houston. This season is notable for the Rockets acquiring top draft pick Steve Francis from the University of Maryland in a trade from the Vancouver Grizzlies; the Grizzlies had drafted Francis with the second overall pick in the 1999 NBA draft, but he refused to play for them. During the off-season, the Rockets acquired Walt Williams, Kelvin Cato and Carlos Rogers from the Portland Trail Blazers, and signed free agent Shandon Anderson. 

The Rockets got off to a bad start losing ten of their first twelve games, but later won six straight games in January, but then lost eight straight in March. Hakeem Olajuwon only played just 44 games due to a hernia injury, and breathing problems, averaging just 10.3 points, 6.2 rebounds and 1.6 blocks per game. The Rockets won seven of their final ten games in April, and finished sixth in the Midwest Division with a record of 34–48, failing to qualify for the playoffs, which was the first time they missed the postseason since the 1991–92 season.

Francis averaged 18.0 points, 5.3 rebounds, 6.6 assists and 1.5 steals per game, as he was named to the NBA All-Rookie First Team, and shared Rookie of the Year honors with Elton Brand of the Chicago Bulls. He also participated in the Rookie-Sophomore Game, and the Slam Dunk Contest during the All-Star Weekend in Oakland. Francis finished second in the Slam Dunk Contest to Vince Carter of the Toronto Raptors. In addition, second-year guard Cuttino Mobley played a sixth man role, averaging 15.8 points per game off the bench, while Anderson provided the team with 12.3 points per game, Williams contributed 10.9 points per game, and Cato provided with 8.7 points, 6.0 rebounds and 1.9 blocks per game. Off the bench, first round draft pick Kenny Thomas averaged 8.3 points and 6.1 rebounds per game, and Rogers contributed 8.0 points and 5.2 rebounds per game. Mobley also finished in second place in Sixth Man of the Year voting.

After he already announced in the off-season that the upcoming season would be his last, Charles Barkley suffered a knee injury during a game against his former team, the Philadelphia 76ers on December 8, 1999, after attempting to block a shot on 76ers' forward Tyrone Hill. The injury forced an early end to his career. However, Barkley would return on April 19, 2000 against the Vancouver Grizzlies, his final NBA game. He came off the bench and scored on a put-back, scoring his final career points, after which he received a standing ovation. After the game, Barkley retired, ending his 16-year NBA career. He averaged 14.5 points and 10.5 rebounds per game in 20 games this season.

Off-season

Draft picks

Roster

Roster Notes
 Center Hakeem Olajuwon holds both American and Nigerian citizenship.

Regular season

Season standings

z – clinched division title
y – clinched division title
x – clinched playoff spot

Record vs. opponents

Player statistics

NOTE: Please write the players statistics in alphabetical order by last name.

Awards and records
 Steve Francis, NBA Rookie of the Year Award
 Steve Francis, NBA All-Rookie Team 1st Team

Transactions

References

Houston Rockets seasons
Houston